"Freakytime" is a song by British group Point Break. It was released on 10 April 2000 on CD single in the United Kingdom through Eternal Records / WEA Records as the third single from their debut studio album, Apocadelic.

Track listing
 CD1 (WEA265CD1)
 "Freakytime"  (radio mix)  - 4:21
 "Freakytime"  (original mix)  - 4:41
 "Freakytime"  (Unplugged version)  - 4:10

 CD2 (WEA265CD2)
 "Freakytime"  (radio mix)  - 4:21
 "Freakytime"  (Supafly dub)  - 5:30
 "The Game"  (Live version)  - 3:52
 CD_Rom Video "Freakytime" - 4:21

Weekly charts

Release history

References

2000 singles
1999 songs
Point Break (band) songs